Sufiyan Shaikh (born 25 November 1990) is an Indian cricketer. He made his debut in first-class cricket for Mumbai against Jharkhand on 3 February 2016 in 2015–16 Ranji Trophy quarter finals. Shaikh has also appeared in other major tournaments like 2010 Under-19 Cricket World Cup, 2014–15 Syed Mushtaq Ali Trophy, 2014–15 Vijay Hazare Trophy.

References 

Cricketers from Maharashtra
1990 births
Living people
Indian cricketers
Mumbai cricketers